Western Wood may refer to:
 Animals
Western wood pewee, a small tyrant flycatcher bird
Myolepta potens, also known as the Western wood-vase hoverfly
 People
Western Wood (MP) (1804–1863), British Liberal Party politician, Member of Parliament for the City of London 1861–63
Western Wood (Queensland politician), (1830—1878), son of Western Wood (MP) and Member of the Queensland Legislative Council
 Places
Augsburg-Western Woods Nature Park, one of the two nature parks in Bavarian Swabia

Animal common name disambiguation pages